Boone's Cave Park is a 110-acre county park located near Lexington, North Carolina  It was established in 1909 by the Daniel Boone Memorial Association.  It is named after American pioneer Daniel Boone.

History
There are a number of "Boone's Cave", but the cave in the park is rumored to be the where Squire and Sarah Jarman Morgan spent their first winter, with the then teenage Daniel upon entering the region in 1751, perhaps to escape Native Americans.  There was a total of 25 people in the group, with all 10 of the Boones children, and other family members and neighbors who all left Pennsylvania together. The Boone family and everyone else soon built  homes near the cave, located next to the Yadkin River.

The Boones eventually settled on the opposite banks of the Yadkin River, which serves as a county line and into what is now Davie County, about two miles (3 km) west of Mocksville.

Geography
The park is approximately 120 acres and supports a variety of flora and fauna native to the area, including a number of hardwoods such as oak, hornbeam and elm. Over 50 different flowering plants such as laurel and wild hydrangea can be found in the park.

The cave itself is 140 foot deep from start to finish, but so shallow that most sections require crawling to gain access.  It is within sight of the Yadkin River and part of the 165-mile Yadkin River Trail.

Gallery

See also
 Boone Trail

References

External links
Official website at Davison County, North Carolina Parks and Recreation
Visit Davidson County information (PDF)
Video Overview of the Cave

Parks in North Carolina
Protected areas of Davidson County, North Carolina
Caves of North Carolina
Landforms of Davidson County, North Carolina
Former state parks of North Carolina